The United States District Court for the District of Maryland (in case citations, D. Md.)  is the federal district court whose jurisdiction is the state of Maryland. Appeals from the District of Maryland are taken to the United States Court of Appeals for the Fourth Circuit (except for patent claims and claims against the U.S. government under the Tucker Act, which are appealed to the Federal Circuit).

Notable past judges of this district include William Paca, a signer of the United States Declaration of Independence. The United States Attorney for the District of Maryland represents the United States in civil and criminal litigation in the court. , the U.S. Attorney is Erek Barron.

Organization of the court 

Under , Maryland consists of a single federal judicial district with two statutory divisions.

Northern Division 
The Northern Division includes Allegany, Anne Arundel, Baltimore, Caroline, Carroll, Cecil, Dorchester, Frederick, Garrett, Harford, Howard, Kent, Queen Anne's, Somerset, Talbot, Washington, Wicomico, Worcester counties and the City of Baltimore, is located in Baltimore, while the statute also provides for the court to sit in Cumberland and Denton.  The Court also maintains an unstaffed location in Salisbury, Maryland.

Southern Division 

The Southern Division includes Calvert, Charles, Montgomery, Prince George's, and St. Mary's counties and sits in Greenbelt.

Current judges 
:

Vacancies and pending nominations

Former judges

Chief judges

Succession of seats

See also 
 Courts of Maryland
 List of current United States district judges
 List of United States federal courthouses in Maryland

References

External links 
 United States District Court for the District of Maryland Official Website
 United States Attorney for the District of Maryland Official Website

Maryland
Maryland law
Prince George's County, Maryland
Baltimore
Cumberland, Maryland
Caroline County, Maryland
Greenbelt, Maryland
1789 establishments in Maryland
Courthouses in Maryland
Courts and tribunals established in 1789